Cedar Grove, North Carolina may refer to:

Cedar Grove (Huntersville, North Carolina), a historic plantation house
Cedar Grove, Orange County, North Carolina, an unincorporated community
Cedar Grove, Randolph County, North Carolina, an unincorporated community

See also
Cedar Grove (disambiguation)